Majipoor Chronicles is a collection of ten stories (five short stories, three novelettes and two novellas) by Robert Silverberg, published in 1982. The stories are all part of the Majipoor series.

Plot summary

The stories involving a young man reviewing memory records of other people, as a framing device.

Contents

 "Prologue"
 Stories:
 "Thesme and the Ghayrog" (1982), novelette
 "The Time of the Burning" (1982), short story
 "In the Fifth Year of the Voyage" (1981), novelette
 "Calintane Explains" (1982), short story
 "The Desert of Stolen Dreams" (1981), novella
 "The Soul Painter and the Shapeshifter" (1981), novelette
 "Crime and Punishment" (1982), short story
 "Among the Dream-Speakers" (1982), short story
 "A Thief in Ni-Moya" (1981), novella
 "Voriax and Valentine" (1982), short story
 "Epilogue"

Reception
Dave Langford reviewed Majipoor Chronicles for White Dwarf #48, and stated that "Pleasant and highly competent, they never quite engage the emotions they should."

Reviews
Review by Jeff Frane (1982) in Locus, #254 March 1982 
Review by Baird Searles (1982) in Isaac Asimov's Science Fiction Magazine, August 1982 
Review by Ian Watson (1982) in Foundation, #26 October 1982 
Review by Nigel Richardson (1983) in Vector 114 
Review by Chris Amies (1992) in Vector 166

References

External links
 

1982 short story collections
Arbor House books
Science fiction short story collections
Short story collections by Robert Silverberg